Oh My Gawd!!! (also known as Oh My Gawd!!!...The Flaming Lips) is The Flaming Lips' second album, released on Restless Records in 1987.

Production 
According to liner notes on a 1998 compilation, Wayne Coyne and Michael Ivins were experimenting with sleep deprivation while recording this album.

Track listing

Notes
 The first track opens with the quote, "Take this, brother. May it serve you well," from the Beatles' "Revolution 9"
 The last track closes with a loop of the phrase "turn off your mind, relax..." sampled from the Beatles' "Tomorrow Never Knows"
 The track "Ode to C.C. (Part I)" references C.C. DeVille from the glam rock band Poison and contains a 30-second clip of "Talk Dirty to Me" when played backward on the vinyl version of the album.

Retrospective reviews 
Critics have noted the album's similarity to the music of Pink Floyd, particularly on the track "One Million Billionth of a Millisecond on a Sunday Morning." Zach Schonfeld, writing for Paste, described Oh My Gawd!!! as the Flaming Lips' "most eclectic early offering", albeit with "plenty of the band’s hooky hillbilly-punk in between." Brad Shoup wrote for Stereogum that "in time, the Flaming Lips would learn to incorporate their experiments into the songs, rather than cramming them in for the hell of it. But their glee at what they get away with here is infectious."

Personnel
The Flaming Lips
 Wayne Coyne – lead vocals, guitar
 Michael Ivins – bass
 Richard English – drums, piano, backing vocals, lead vocals on "Can't Exist" and "Thanks to You"
Technical
Ruben Ayala - engineer
The Flaming Lips - front cover painting
Michele Vlasimsky - photography

References

1987 albums
The Flaming Lips albums
Restless Records albums